Padmaja Naidu (17 November 1900 – 2 May 1975) was an Indian freedom fighter and politician who was the 4th Governor of West Bengal from 3 November 1956 to 1 June 1967. She was daughter of Sarojini Naidu.

Early life
Padmaja Naidu was born in Hyderabad to a Bengali mother and a Telugu father. Her mother was the poet and Indian freedom fighter, Sarojini Naidu. Her father Mutyala Govindrajulu Naidu was a physician. She had four siblings, Jayasurya, Leelamani, Nilawar and Randheer.

Political career

At the age of 21, she co-founded the  Indian National Congress in the Nizam ruled princely state of Hyderabad. She was jailed for taking part in the "Quit India" movement in 1942. After Independence, she was elected to the Indian Parliament in 1950. In 1956 she was appointed  the Governor of West Bengal. She was also associated with the Red Cross and was the chairperson of the Indian Red Cross from 1971 to 1972.

Personal life

Early in her life, Padmaja was a close friend of Ruttie Petit who married Muhammad Ali Jinnah, later the  founder of Pakistan.
Padmaja Naidu had a close relationship with the Nehru family, including with Jawaharlal Nehru and his sister, Vijaya Lakshmi Pandit. Pandit later told Pupul Jayakar, Indira Gandhi's friend and biographer, that Padmaja Naidu and Nehru lived together for many years. Nehru did not marry Padmaja  because he did not want to hurt his daughter, Indira. However, Padmaja never married hoping Nehru would propose one day.
After retiring, Padmaja lived until her death in 1975 in a bungalow on the Teen Murti Bhavan estate, Prime Minister Nehru's official residence and later a museum dedicated to his memory.

Legacy
The Padmaja Naidu Himalayan Zoological Park in Darjeeling is named after her.

References

Further reading
 

1900 births
1975 deaths
Indian National Congress politicians from Andhra Pradesh
Governors of West Bengal
Women state governors of India
Women in West Bengal politics
Women in Andhra Pradesh politics
Recipients of the Padma Vibhushan in public affairs
20th-century Indian women politicians
20th-century Indian politicians
Indian independence activists from Telangana